South Carolina Highway 267 (SC 267) is a  state highway in the U.S. state of South Carolina. The highway connects the Santee area with rural areas of Orangeburg and Calhoun counties, via Elloree.

Route description
SC 267 begins at an intersection with U.S. Route 15 (US 15; Bass Drive) south-southwest of Santee, within Orangeburg County. It travels to the north-northwest and crosses over Providence Swamp before intersecting US 301 (Five Chop Road). The highway curves to the north and crosses railroad tracks and intersects SC 6 (Old Number Six Highway) southeast of Elloree. The highways travel concurrently to the northwest into Elloree. There, they intersect the northern terminus of SC 47 (West Cleveland Street). Just before leaving town, they pass Joe Miller Park. Approximately  later, they split, with SC 267 heading to the north-northeast. The highway enters Calhoun County just before Peachtree Road. Then, SC 267 curves to the north-northwest. It crosses over Halfway Swamp Creek. It crosses some railroad tracks and passes by, but does not enter, Lone Star. It intersects the northern terminus of SC 33 (Cameron Road) northwest of Lone Star. The highway curves to the north and curves back to the northwest and crosses Warley Creek. It intersects SC 419 (Fort Motte Road). SC 267 crosses Squirrel Creek before meeting its northern terminus, an intersection with US 601 (Colonel Thomson Highway) southeast of Fort Motte, where the roadway continues as Adams Road.

Major intersections

See also

References

External links

SC 267 South Carolina Hwy Index

267
Transportation in Orangeburg County, South Carolina
Transportation in Calhoun County, South Carolina